Mandhana may refer to:

 Smriti Mandhana, an Indian cricketer
 Mandhana, Bhiwani, a village in the Bhiwani district of the Indian state of Haryana
 Mandhana, Kanpur, a town in the Kanpur district of the Indian state of Uttar Pradesh
 Mandhana, Mahendragarh, a village in the Mahendragarh district of the Indian state of Haryana
 Mandhana, Sirmaur, a village in the Sirmaur district of the Indian state of Himachal Pradesh